Dragons Rhoendorf is a professional basketball club based in Bad Honnef, North Rhine-Westphalia, Germany. The team had its most successful years from 1995 to 1999 when it played in the Basketball Bundesliga and reached the semi-finals in 1999. Since then, the club has voluntarily moved down to the third highest national division, Pro B, where the Dragons still compete today.

History

Beginning years (1912–1995)
The team started out as Rhöndorfer TV.

Alternating path between ProA and Pro B (1995–2010)
In 1995, the then called TV Tatami Rhöndorf team moved up from the second League north to the Basketball Bundesliga, Germany's prime basketball league. In 1999, the licensed was transferred to the Skyliners Frankfurt while Rhöndorf used the license it gained from EnBW Ludwigsburg and stayed in the 2nd league. After a renewed athletic ascent, the license was passed on again. Beneficiaries were this time RheinEnergy Cologne and later Cologne 99ers.
Rhöndorfer played still second rate and qualifies for the season 2007/2008 for the new established ProA. After the fourth place the Dragons surprisingly retired to the lower echelon of the 2nd league. There they want to focus more on the training of young talents.
They pursue this target for the season 2006/2007 also together with the Telekom Baskets Bonn. Under the name SG Bonn/Rhöndorf both clubs line up together in the NBBL. In the 2008/2009 season the Dragons finished in fourth place and missed promotion to the ProA.

During the 2009/2010 season the Dragons announced that the longtime sponsor Franz Ludwig Solzbacher has ceased his engagement with the end of the season. 
So the Dragons start in the season 2010/2011 without the addition SOBA in the name.
Also it was founded a new GmbH. The Dragons Rhöndorf Marketing GmbH adopt the license at the end of the season 2009/2010 and is the new carrier of the game operation of the Dragons. The general manager of the new GmbH becomes the manager of Dragons Michael Wichterich.

The 2009/2010 season became one of the most successful seasons in club history. With 26 triumphs and 4 defeats the Soba Dragons became sovereign champions of the ProB and secure the right for the promotion in the Pro A.For this Eric Detlev was awarded as coach of the year of the ProB. During the summer they tried to protect feverishly the required budget for the ProA and it was successful. But the face of the team changed a lot. Longtime, established player left the club, including Christopher Rojik, Johannes Lange and Jürgen Malbeck. Also it was not possible to hold idol of the public DeUndraeSpraggins. 
With a strong younger team they wanted to try to establish the club again in the ProA.
But already a matchday before the end of the season it was clear that the Dragons would miss the place in the ProA. After a 75:79 defeat against Würzburg after double extension stood the descent firm. Even returning DeUndraeSpraggins could not change that.

ProB, Pro A and again ProB (2011–present)
Due to the license withdrawal against USC Freiburg and the GiroLive-Ballers Osnabrück the Dragons received their start right in the ProA for 2011/2012 first back. However, at the end of June 2011, those responsible announced that the Dragons would retire to the ProB.  Financial aspects were responsible for this. 
There the younger team was able to establish itself in the course of the season and reached the end of the regular season 5th place of the south relay. In the play-offs the Dragons succumbed the SGBraunschweig in two games and bowed out in the round of sixteen. Shortly thereafter followed the separation of coach Eric Detlev after over 10 years working for the Dragons. A reason for the separation were increasingly different views on the orientation of the club, but also the request for new impulses for the teams and the concept of the Dragons.

In 2012 Boris Kaminski was introduced as a new head coach and sports director. Kaminski previously worked for the Hertener Löwen. The first season under Boris Kaminski supervision finished the Dragons in the first place 1 in the south relay with 19 wins and 3 losses. In the first round of the play-offs, the Dragons played against the BSW Sixers from Sandersdorf and also bowed out due to injury concerns in the first round. For the season 2013/2014 returned with Fabian Thüligaidol of the public back to the Dragons, after he had previously dissolved his contract with the Telekom Baskets Bonn. The team reached the 2014 play-offs with 12 wins and 10 losses in the regular season. Rival in the round of sixteen was the former Bundesliga team Schwelmer Baskets. Against the baskets, the Dragons finally bowed out with 1:2 in the first round. Shortly after leaving the play-offs, the Dragons announced the contract extension with head coach Boris Kaminski. He received a new contract until summer 2016.

For the 2014/2015 season returned a former youth player of the Dragons Savo Milovic. 
Similarly the talents Kostja Mushidi, Alexander Angerer and Alexander Möller were appointed to the ProB squad of Rhöndorf. In the course of the season followed the separation of sports manager Sebastian Schmidt due to different views in the sporting and economic sphere of the club. Athletic established the Dragons in the top field of ProB-South and could finish the regular season in third place.

In the play-offs the team of Boris Kaminski played in the round of sixteen against the Uni-Reisen Leipzig and bowed out with 1:2 and therefore did not survived for the fourth time in a row the first round of the play-offs.

At the end of the season 2014/2015 it became known that the two athletically qualified teams of SC Rist Wedel and the Oldenburger TB would not make use of their right of promotion. 
After the Uni-ReisenLeipzig renounced the promotion the license went to the Dragons Rhöndorf, which officially announced on May 12, 2015 to compete again in the ProA. After only two wins and 16 defeats in January 2016 head coach Boris Kaminski resigned from his duties. Successor was his former co-coach Christian Mehrens. But even under Mehrens supervision the team did not reached the sporting turn around and the Dragons descended as the bottom of the league again in the ProB. Shortly after the end of the season, the Dragons announced the separation of Christian Mehrens, who received no new contract as a head coach. His predecessor Boris Kaminski returned to the Dragons Rhöndorf as the new general manager.

New head coach for the 2016/2017 season was Matthias Sonnenschein, who previously worked as an assistant coach for the Dragons and as head coach the JBBL team of SG Bonn / Rhöndorf. The season was a real rollercoaster ride and culminated in the final round of the main round in a close final for the last playoff places. Ultimately, the Dragons slipped from seventh to tenth place due to their own loss to the Weißenhorn Youngstars and the parallel triumphs of the LicherBasketBären, the TG s.OliverWürzburg and the Skyliners Frankfurt II and had the first time in the club's history in the ProB relegation round.

With the American Aaron Nelson left the statistically best player of the team before the start of the relegation round, the team management made a change of the coach at the end of March to set the fight another attraction:  the Dutchman Thomas Roijakkers, who had been dismissed a month earlier in the likewise relegation-threatened RSV Eintracht (ProB north-relay), replaced Sunshine as a head coach.

Ultimately the Rhöndorfer managed under Roijakkers leadership the league due to a 59-84 away win on the last day of the play-offs at the LicherBasketBären and were in the final table of the relegation round two points in front of the Uni-ReisenLeipzig, which due to a violation of the League statutes during the Playdowns had to accept a deduction of two players.

Intensive cooperation with Bonn
Several of the Dragons' players get a chance to earn nominations for the Baskets Bonn squad in the Basketball Bundesliga, Germany's prime division, and European cups such as the Basketball Champions League.

During the summer 2017, general manager Boris Kaminski announced his resignation from the Dragons Rhöndorf and switched to a sponsor to free economy after 5 years in the club. His replacement became Alexander Dohms who already worked as the general manager for the club between 2011 and 2012. At the same time Thomas Adelt became the new head coach for the Dragons. He was in the past the second representation for the Telekom Baskets Bonn (1. Regionalleague west).

Another announcement was that the cooperation between Bonn and Rhöndorf should furthermore intensified and the Telekom Baskets Bonn are taking responsibility for the sportive interests from the Dragons Rhöndorf. They want a consistent conceptual planning which includes JBBL and NBBL from the team Bonn/Rhöndorf to reach their goals.

Team 2017/2018
Kader der Dragons Rhöndorf in der Saison 2017/2018

Coaches

Change to season 2017/2018
Zugänge: Thomas Adelt (Head coach/Telekom Baskets Bonn II), K.J. Sherrill (Hertener Löwen – not anymore in thesquad), Max Schwamborn (Co-Trainer/RheinStars Köln), Fabian Vermum (TuS Brauweiler), Kameron Taylor (Erdgas Ehingen/Urspringschule), Karl Mamady Dia (Telekom Baskets Bonn II), Ronalds Elksnis (BK Jelgava/LAT), Joe Koschade (Telekom Baskets Bonn II), Kevin Thomas (Enosis Neon Paralimni/CYP)

Abgänge: Will Trawick(target unknown), Thomas Roijakkers (Head coach/Limburg United), Mike Lucier(target unknown), SavoMilovic (Co-Trainer/Telekom Baskets Bonn II), Florian Wendeler (Rot-Weiss Cuxhaven Basketball), Bastian Winterhalter (2. team), SaschaTratnjek (2. team), K.J. Sherrill (Telekom Baskets Bonn II), Maximilian Fouhy (SV Hagen-Haspe)

Well-known alternating players
The following players  were before, meanwhile or after their playtime a member of the Dragons A-National players:
	 
  Yassin Idbihi (2001–03)
  Michael Koch 2003/04

Other former well known players are:
	 
  Steven Key (1996–99)
  William Christmas (2021–Present)
  Florian Koch (2011–13)

Coach history
   Michael Laufer – 1993 to 1995
   Rob Friedrich – 1995 to 1996
   Tom Schneeman – 1996 to 1998
   Joe Whelton – 1998 to 1999
   Berthold Bisselik – 1999 to 2005, as well as 2006 to 2007
   Klaus Perwas – 2005 to 2006
   Olaf Stolz – 2007 to 2009
   Eric Detlev – 2009 to 2012
   Boris Kaminski – 2012 to 2016
   Christian Mehrens – 2016
   Matthias Sonnenschein – 2016 to 2017
   Thomas Roijakkers – 2017
   Thomas Adelt – since 2017

Year-by-year finishes
 1994/1995: 1. Place in 2. Bundesliga North-relay (rise in the Basketball-Bundesliga)
 1995/1996: 11. Place Basketball-Bundesliga
 1996/1997: 2. Place Basketball-Bundesliga (2:4 bow out in the Play-Off quarter-final against Telekom Baskets Bonn)
 1997/1998: 5. Place Basketball-Bundesliga (1:4 bow out in the Play-Off quarter final against TBB Trier)
 1998/1999: 3. Place  Basketball-Bundesliga (1:3 bow out in the Play-Off semi-final against Telekom Baskets Bonn, afterwards sale from the licence to the Frankfurt Skyliners)
 1999/2000: 2. Place  in 2. Bundesliga North-relay (3. Place in the riseround)
 2000/2001: 1Place .in 2. Bundesliga North-relay (start right for the first league became to  Köln 99ers delivered)
 2001/2002: 5. Place  in 2. Bundesliga North-relay
 2002/2003: 9. Place  in 2. Bundesliga North-relay
 2003/2004: 4.Place in 2. Bundesliga North-relay
 2004/2005: 3.Place  in 2. Bundesliga North-relay
 2005/2006: 6. Place  in 2. Bundesliga North-relay
 2006/2007: 4. Place  in 2. Bundesliga North-relay
 2007/2008: 4.Place  ProA
 2008/2009: 4. Place  ProA (afterwards voluntary retreat to  ProB)
 2009/2010: 1. Place ProB (rise to  ProA)
 2010/2011: 16. Place   ProA (descent to ProB)
 2011/2012: 5. Place ProB-south (0:2 bow out in the Play-Off round of sixteen against SG Braunschweig)
 2012/2013: 1. Place ProB–south (0:2 bow out in the Play-Off round of sixteen against BSW Sixers)
 2013/2014: 6. Place ProB-south (1:2 bow out in the Play-Off round of sixteen against Schwelmer Baskets)
 2014/2015: 3. Place  ProB–south (1:2 bow out in the Play-Off round of sixteen against Uni-Riesen Leipzig, rise to ProA by licence absence from Uni-Riesen Leipzig)
 2015/2016: 16. Place  ProA (descent to ProB)
 2016/2017: 10.Place  ProB-south

Team records

Other Teams
 2. men team: 2.Regionalleague West
 1. Ladys team: 1. Regionalleague West
 U 19 male NBBL as cooperation SG Bonn / Rhöndorf
 U 19 female NRW-league
 U 16 male JBBL as cooperation SG Bonn / Rhöndorf
 U 17 female WNBL
 U 15 female Regionalleague
 U 14 male Regionalleague

Home arenas
The Coliseum Menzenberg in Bad Honnef is the gymnasium where all home matches take place. The gymnasium includes capacity  for 1500 places.
Over the season 2006/2007 was it only possible to play in the neighbour coliseum „Sporthalle am Sonnnenhuegel“ in Oberpleis, because of an arson was the home coliseum unplayable.
On time to the new season 2007/2008 was it luckily possible to practice and play again in the new renovated coliseum. 
Another renovation took place in the summerbreak 2015 and now you can see new scoreboards, a LED Videowall and a new floor.

Other playplaces from the rest of the Dragons are:

 New coliseum from Siebengebirgsgymnasium
 New coliseum from 
 Old coliseum from 
 Coliseum Muehlenweg in Rhöndorf

Schoss Hagerhof
Since several years there is a cooperation with the high school Schloss Hagerhof to allow an optimum network of sport and education to the talents. Many talented players went to Schloss Hagerhof, lived in the boarding school and graduated there. Also the high school Hagerhof offers with his main focus on sports the possibility to develop and individually to practice besides the Club practice to many young talents.

References

1912 establishments in Germany
Bad Honnef
Basketball clubs in North Rhine-Westphalia
Basketball teams established in 1912
Sport in North Rhine-Westphalia